Gates Hall and Pultneyville Public Square is a historic theater and village green located at Pultneyville in Wayne County, New York.

History 
Gates Hall was built in 1826 by the Union Church Society as a place of worship for the community's Methodists, Presbyterians, and Episcopalians.  

In 1867, the building began to be used as a summer season community theater. Theater performances have taken place every calendar year since 1867, making Gates Hall both the oldest and the longest running community theater in the United States. 

It was remodeled in 1894 in the Queen Anne style to serve as a multipurpose civic building. It is a two-story, gable roofed building resting on a raised basement.  Pultneyville Public Square is a village green, approximately one acre in extent, that serves the passive recreational needs of the hamlet.

It was listed on the National Register of Historic Places in 2000.

References

External links
Gates Hall website

Theatres on the National Register of Historic Places in New York (state)
Theatres in New York (state)
Theatres completed in 1826
Buildings and structures in Wayne County, New York
1826 establishments in New York (state)
National Register of Historic Places in Wayne County, New York